The 1987 Ebel U.S. Pro Indoor was a men's tennis tournament played on indoor carpet courts that was part of the 1987 Nabisco Grand Prix. It was the 20th edition of the tournament and was played at the Spectrum in Philadelphia, Pennsylvania in the United States from February 2 to February 9, 1987. Fifth-seeded Tim Mayotte won the singles title.

Finals

Singles

 Tim Mayotte defeated  John McEnroe 3–6, 6–1, 6–3, 6–1
 It was Mayotte's 1st title of the year and the 4th of his career.

Doubles

 Sergio Casal /  Emilio Sánchez defeated  Christo Steyn /  Danie Visser 3–6, 6–1, 7–6
 It was Casal's 1st title of the year and the 10th of his career. It was Sanchez's 1st title of the year and the 12th of his career.

References

External links
 ITF tournament edition details

Ebel U.S. Pro Indoor
U.S. Pro Indoor
U.S. Professional Indoor
U.S. Professional Indoor
U.S. Professional Indoor